Ivan Paladina (born 12 June 1983) is a Croatian economist, consultant and politician who served as the Minister of Construction, Physical Planning and State Property from 2022 to 2023.

During his work as consultant he was involved in multiple projects tied to Russian and Israeli investors in Croatia including their controversial Kupari and Golf investment projects near Dubrovnik, that were never realized.

Early life and education 
Paladina was born on 12 June 1983 in Rijeka, Croatia, than part of SFR Yugoslavia. 

In 2006 he received a Master's degree in Economics from the Faculty of Economics at the University of Zagreb.

Professional work in business 
He worked in various companies in managerial and executive positions. He was, among others, deputy director at Razvoj golf company and chairman of the supervisory board at Hidroelektra niskogradnja company. He ran his own company Delta savjetovanje, he was also a member of the board of directors and from 2015 to 2017 the president of Institut IGH, a company operating in the construction sector. He served as a director in Avenue ulaganja and as an advisor to the board of directors of Hrvatska poštanska banka.

In March 2022 (as a non-partisan on the recommendation of the Croatian Democratic Union), he became Ministry of Construction, Spatial Planning and State Property in the second government of Andrej Plenković.

See also
Cabinet of Andrej Plenković II

References

External links

Biography on page of the Croatian Government

1983 births
Living people
Economy ministers of Croatia
University of Zagreb alumni
Politicians from Rijeka
Government ministers of Croatia